Senjka Danhieux (born 28 April 1984, in Jette), better known under his stage name RoxorLoops, is a Belgian beatboxer and songwriter. He currently lives in Denmark, where he studied vocal leading and singing at the Royal Academy of Music in Aalborg.

Career

Early career 
In 2004, Danhieux won the Belgian Beatboxing Championship. One year later, he competed in the Beatbox Battle World Championship, in which he won second place. In 2006, he was a part of the group Beatoxic, which performed the song "Feel Like" in the second heat of Eurosong '06, the Belgian national selection for the Eurovision Song Contest 2006, but failed to qualify for the semi-finals.

Eurovision Song Contest 2011 
In 2011, he participated in the Belgian national selection Eurovision 2011: Qui? A vous de choisir, this time as part of the a cappella group Witloof Bay with the song "With Love Baby" (co-written by Danhieux). The group went on to win the competition and were given the right to represent Belgium in the Eurovision Song Contest 2011 held in Düsseldorf, Germany. The entry did not qualify for the final, finishing in eleventh place in the second semi-final.

Dansk Melodi Grand Prix 2020 

In 2020, Danhieux was selected by the Danish broadcaster DR to compete in Dansk Melodi Grand Prix, Denmark’s national selection for the Eurovision Song Contest. Together with his girlfriend Jasmin Rose, he performed the song "Human" (co-written by Lise Cabble) in the final on 7 March 2020, but ultimately failed to advance to the superfinal.

Discography

As part of Witloof Bay

As featured artist

References

External links 
 Official website

1984 births
Living people
People from Jette
Beatboxers
A cappella musicians
Belgian male singers
Belgian songwriters
Belgian expatriates in Denmark
Dansk Melodi Grand Prix contestants